Samsung SPH-G1000 is a gaming phone introduced by Samsung in March 2005 at the CTIA show. It features a 2.2-inch TFT-LCD display, a 1.3-megapixel camera and a 3D acceleration chip for 3D-gaming capabilities. It was primarily designed for video games playing. It was released in South Korea in April 2005.

See also
N-Gage
N-Gage QD
Xperia Play

References

Samsung mobile phones
Mobile phones introduced in 2005